In enzymology, a NAD+-diphthamide ADP-ribosyltransferase is an enzyme that catalyzes the chemical reaction

NAD+ + peptide diphthamide  nicotinamide + peptide N-(ADP-D-ribosyl)diphthamide

Thus, the two substrates of this enzyme are NAD+ and peptide diphthamide, whereas its two products are nicotinamide and peptide N-(ADP-D-ribosyl)diphthamide.

This enzyme belongs to the family of glycosyltransferases, to be specific, the pentosyltransferases. The systematic name of this enzyme class is NAD+:peptide-diphthamide N-(ADP-D-ribosyl)transferase. Other names in common use include ADP-ribosyltransferase, mono(ADPribosyl)transferase, and NAD-diphthamide ADP-ribosyltransferase.

Structural studies

Clinical significance
The extracellular ADP-ribosyl-transferase ART2 is expressed only on T cells. T cell activation of P2X7 receptors can activate the T cells or cause T cell differentiation, can affect T cell migration or (at high extracellular levels of NAD+) can induce cell death by ART2.

References

See also
Diphtheria toxin
Pseudomonas exotoxin
ADP-ribosylation

EC 2.4.2
NADH-dependent enzymes
Enzymes of known structure